Lee Tea-young (born 25 November 1977) is a Korean handball player who competed in the 2004 Summer Olympics and in the 2008 Summer Olympics.

References

1977 births
Living people
South Korean male handball players
Olympic handball players of South Korea
Handball players at the 2004 Summer Olympics
Handball players at the 2008 Summer Olympics
Asian Games medalists in handball
Handball players at the 2006 Asian Games
Handball players at the 2010 Asian Games
Asian Games gold medalists for South Korea
Sungkyunkwan University alumni
Medalists at the 2010 Asian Games
21st-century South Korean people